The Sims 4 is a social simulation game developed by Maxis and published by Electronic Arts. It is the fourth major title in The Sims series, and is the sequel to The Sims 3 (2009). The game was released in North America on September 2, 2014, for Windows, an OS X version was released in February 2015, and PlayStation 4 and Xbox One versions were released in November 2017. The game was moved to a free-to-play model on October 18, 2022, monetized by the purchase of various paid downloadable content packs that have been developed since its release.

Like previous titles in the series, The Sims 4 allows players to create and dress characters called "Sims", build and furnish houses for them, and simulate their everyday lives. The game introduces a newly developed custom game engine, with improved character creation and housebuilding tools, as well as deeper in-game simulation with the new emotion and personality systems for Sims.

Development of The Sims 4 began as an online multiplayer title, but plans were shifted to a single-player experience following the negative launch reception of Maxis' SimCity in 2013. In the months leading up to the game's release, Maxis revealed that several features present in prior The Sims main titles would be omitted at launch, citing insufficient development time and technical complexity; this was received negatively by players. The Sims 4 received mixed reviews from critics upon its initial release, who praised the game's visual design, improved AI simulation for Sims, and the simplified building tools, but criticized the lack of content compared to prior The Sims titles, frequent loading screens, and missing features.

The Sims 4 has been commercially successful, topping the all-format video game chart in 2014, and has received 36 million players worldwide as of 2021. Development of the game has been supported with numerous paid downloadable content packs, namely twelve expansion packs, twelve game packs, and several stuff packs and kits. The most recent expansion pack, The Sims 4: Growing Together, was released on March 16, 2023. Free content updates introducing and expanding major features have also been released, such as swimming pools, more character customization options, more building tools, and gameplay scenarios.

Gameplay 
The Sims 4 is a social simulation game, similar to preceding titles in the series. There is no primary objective or goal to achieve, and instead of fulfilling objectives, the player is encouraged to make choices and engage fully in an interactive environment. The focus of the game is on the simulated lives of virtual people called "Sims", and the player is responsible for directing their actions, attending to their "needs", and helping them attain their desires. Though not mandatory, objective-based gameplay is available if the player desires, with each Sim having lifelong aspirations, and "wants and fears" personal goals that are generated based on current gameplay.

Simoleons (§) are the unit of currency used in the game, and Sims communicate in a fictional language called Simlish. Sims have six needs: hunger, bladder, hygiene, social, fun, and energy — these needs are drained as the Sim progresses through an in-game day, and are refilled by various household items and furniture. Sims primarily make money by getting a job, or selling crafted items such as paintings and garden produce, and Sims need to develop skills for jobs and crafting items; for example, Sims in the Culinary career track need to be proficient in the Cooking skill. The game includes a comprehensive list of cheats, such as infinite money and hidden gameplay options. Paid downloadable content (DLC) packs expand the number of features, objects, worlds, and gameplay options available to play with.

The OS X and Windows versions of The Sims 4 include extensive modding support, as in previous main The Sims games. There are two types of player-developed mod content: script mods and custom content — script mods typically modify gameplay behavior or add gameplay mechanics; custom content encompasses cosmetic items including custom hairstyles, makeup, clothing, and furniture.

Create-a-Sim 

Create-a-Sim is the main interface for creating a Sim in The Sims 4, where individual Sims and families can be created and placed in the game world. Sim facial and bodily features are adjusted by directly selecting and manipulating the respective area; selections of pre-made facial features are also available. Sims have eight life stages: baby, infant, toddler, child, teen, young adult, adult, and elder — all life stages can be created in Create-a-Sim, with the exception of the baby life stage. Toddlers were absent from the original game release, but were added via an update in 2017. The infant life stage is set to be added to the game via a March 2023 update. 

Each Sim has three personality traits, and an aspiration containing its own special trait. Traits determine the personality of a Sim, and significantly affect a Sim's behavior and emotions. Aspirations are lifelong goals for Sims, each containing a list of tasks to be fulfilled in gameplay; Sims get a reward trait when completing an aspiration, which give them a boost when performing actions relevant to the aspiration. When creating a new Sim, a personality quiz option automatically generates a personality and aspiration for the Sim. The "Play with Genetics" function allows players to create siblings, children, and parents of household Sims, inheriting facial features, and physical traits such as skin tones, hair colors, and eye colors from the selected household Sims. Added in a 2021 update, "likes and dislikes" determine aesthetics and activities preferred by each Sim, and can be assigned in Create-a-Sim or developed in gameplay.

Occult Sims are introduced in various expansion packs and "game packs", these occults include aliens, vampires, mermaids, spellcasters, and werewolves; some occults can be directly created in Create-a-Sim. Cat and dog pets are introduced via the Cats & Dogs expansion pack, and can be created in the "Create-a-Pet" mode within Create-a-Sim, or adopted during gameplay. Gender options for Sims were expanded in a 2016 update, allowing for greater freedom of gender expression. With this update, hairstyles and outfits can be worn by any Sim of any gender, and pregnancy is now possible regardless of gender. The diversity of skin tones in the game was greatly expanded in a 2020 update, following strong player demand; skin tones were divided into warm, neutral, and cold tones, and the ability to adjust the saturation and opacity of skin tones and makeup colors was introduced.

Preferred pronoun options for Sims were added in a 2022 update, developed in collaboration with the It Gets Better Project and GLAAD; Sims can have preset pronouns, such as he/him, she/her, or they/them, or players can customize their own set of pronouns for their Sims. Another 2022 update added the ability to select a Sim's sexuality, as well as their means of expressing attraction, either romantically or sexually. The update additionally enables a Sim to have flexible sexuality, with changes possible later as the character progresses during gameplay.

Build mode 

Build mode is the main interface for constructing and furnishing houses and lots in The Sims 4. Buy mode, the interface for purchasing house furnishings in previous games, is merged into Build mode. In Build mode, players purchase furniture and appliances for Sims such as televisions, showers, beds, and fridges, with each of them having a set function, ranging from fulfilling a need or raising a skill or simply being decorative. Some locked or hidden items may be unlocked through the progression of career levels or cheats. Players can also construct buildings and design interior layouts from scratch, then save their custom buildings and lots into the in-game library. Entire rooms and buildings can be resized, moved, and duplicated, along with all objects placed within the room. Alternatively, selections of pre-made furnished rooms and buildings are available. Players can build on and customize every lot on the world map, and can only build within the boundaries of each lot. Bodies of water can be constructed, such as decorative fountains, swimming pools, and ponds. Interior construction options include doors, archways, half-walls, wall coverings, and floors.

When constructing a building, buildings can have up to four floors, walls of a building floor can have three different heights, buildings foundations with adjustable heights can be added, and windows can be moved up or down vertically along a wall. Additional construction options such as basements, L- and U-shaped stairs, ladders, and floor platforms were added in later updates.

Worlds 
[[File:Bibury Cottages in the Cotswolds - June 2007.jpg|thumb|right|Worlds included in The Sims 4'''s DLC packs frequently borrow inspirations from real-life locations; areas in rural England—such as Cotswolds (pictured)—were cited as inspirations for the Henford-on-Bagley world in Cottage Living.]]
A world is a collection of several neighborhoods, each containing several residential or community lots available for players to customize and build upon. Sims can visit any lot located in any world, regardless of which world they reside in, and Sims from other households can be seen as non-player characters roaming within worlds. Lots can be visited directly by Sims from the map view, with the exception of 'secret' lots, which can only be accessed through interacting with special gameplay objects, or as work locations for some careers. Unlike The Sims 3, The Sims 4 does not support open worlds, and travelling between lots and worlds triggers a loading screen. However, neighborhoods allow some open world functionality by allowing Sims to interact with gameplay objects placed within the neighborhood's boundaries.The Sims 4 includes three worlds in its base game: Willow Creek and Oasis Springs contain pre-made houses, community lots, and Sim families, while Newcrest is a sandbox world only containing blank lots free for players to build upon. Additional worlds are included in the game's expansion packs and "game packs", with the added world usually being a core feature of the pack. These worlds frequently borrow inspirations from real-life locations; for example, Island Living introduces a tropical world named Sulani, Jungle Adventure introduces a Latin American-inspired vacation world named Selvadorada, Snowy Escape introduces a mountainous Japan-inspired world named Mt. Komorebi, and Cottage Living includes a rural England-inspired world named Henford-on-Bagley.

 New gameplay features 
The Gallery is an online content exchange that allows players to upload, share, and download custom-made Sims, Sim households, rooms, and buildings; it is accessible directly in-game, or online via The Sims 4 website. The Gallery was later made available to the PlayStation 4 and Xbox One versions of the game in 2020.

Emotion is a new gameplay mechanic, building upon the mood system of Sims in previous titles; emotions can be affected by in-game actions, events, and social interactions with other Sims. Positive and negative moodlets (a type of buff) influence the current emotion of a Sim, and can directly impact Sim actions and behavior, such as increasing the efficiency of gaining skill points. There are several types and intensities of emotions, such as happy, sad, and angry; some high-intensity emotional stages introduce a probability of emotional death. The multitasking system is a new gameplay mechanic that allows Sims to perform multiple actions at a single time, such as having a conversation with other Sims while cooking.

 Development 
Development of The Sims 4 began as an online multiplayer title, under the working title of "Olympus". Maxis intended to incorporate online multiplayer gameplay elements, as part of publisher Electronic Arts' (EA) plan to release more online multiplayer titles. EA labels president Frank Gibeau stated in 2012, "I have not green-lit one game to be developed as a single player experience. Today, all of our games include online applications and digital services that make them live 24/7/365." However, these plans were changed following the negative launch reception of Maxis' SimCity in March 2013, which was plagued with widespread technical and gameplay problems relating to the game's mandatory network connectivity. As a result, "Olympus" was reworked to a single-player experience, and released as The Sims 4. The release version of the game only requires an internet connection during the initial installation process, for game activation with an Origin account. Additionally, development of The Sims 4 was affected by layoffs at EA Salt Lake in January 2014, which was assisting in development of the game; remaining EA Salt Lake employees working on the game were transferred to Maxis' Redwood Shores, California studio.The Sims 4 uses a newly-developed proprietary game engine, marketed as "SmartSim". In conjunction with this engine, Maxis focused on developing the new Sim emotion system for The Sims 4, as well as more expressive and complex Sim animations, describing Sim behavior in previous The Sims titles as "robotic" in comparison. Development of walking animations and facial expressions centered around better illustrating the emotions of Sims in gameplay, as well as making social interactions between Sims appear more natural and lifelike. British neoclassical composer Ilan Eshkeri composed the game's orchestral soundtrack. This included over 140 brief sound effects to accompany various "key emotional moments" for Sims, such as encountering a fight, a first kiss, a wedding, or a toilet breaking. Compared to previous The Sims titles, The Sims 4s soundtrack was designed to emphasize the impact of Sim emotions during these gameplay events. Eshkeri cited difficulty in composing music for the game due to its sandbox nature, contrasting it to his previous works with film scores. All music was recorded at the Abbey Road Studios in London, and performed by the London Metropolitan Orchestra.

 Omitted features 
In the months leading up to the game's release in September 2014, Maxis revealed that several gameplay features present in previous The Sims titles, such as swimming pools and the toddler Sim life stage, and family trees would not be included in The Sims 4. Some gameplay features introduced in The Sims 3, such as open worlds and the "Create-a-Style" color customization feature, were also excluded from the game. These announcements sparked criticism among players, who expressed dismay at the exclusion of "core" The Sims gameplay elements, particularly swimming pools and toddler Sims, with fans signing a petition created on the Change.org website in response. Some speculated that the aforementioned features were intentionally left out to be re-introduced in future paid DLC.

Maxis issued a statement responding to player criticism, specifying that they had to allocate development resources to the newly developed game engine, technologies, AI simulation system, as well as the revamped Create-a-Sim and Build modes, as reason for the omitted features. They contended that "it was not possible for us to include every single feature and piece of content we added to The Sims 3 over the last five years", but clarified that excluded features could be re-introduced in the future via game updates or DLC.

 Release and marketing 

On May 6, 2013, Maxis confirmed that The Sims 4 was in development, and would be scheduled for release in 2014. The Sims 4 was unveiled via gameplay demos and release trailers in August 2013 at Gamescom. Several trailers were released on YouTube in May 2014; a Create-a-Sim trailer revealed the variety of Sim customization options; a Build mode trailer showcased the new interface and building tools. Game footage was shown at the Electronic Entertainment Expo (E3) on June 9, 2014, and the game's North American release date of September 2, 2014 was announced, to be released on Windows. A free playable demo of the Create-a-Sim feature was made available for download on August 12, 2014.

Released alongside the standard edition, the digital-only Deluxe edition of the game includes bonus gameplay objects and clothing, and a digital copy of the game soundtrack; the Premium edition additionally includes a hardcover book containing game tips and artwork. An OS X version was released on February 17, 2015. PlayStation 4 and Xbox One versions were released on November 17, 2017, co-developed with Blind Squirrel Games; in contrast to previous The Sims entries on consoles, the console versions of The Sims 4 do not exclude content or DLC packs compared to the OS X and Windows versions.

 Collaborative promotions 
A Sims-themed gaming headset, mouse, and "Plumbob" USB light designed by SteelSeries were released alongside the game's launch in 2014, with the peripherals having built-in LED lights that change according to the playable Sim's mood. Maxis announced a collaboration in 2019 with Italian luxury fashion house Moschino; the collaboration includes a collection of pixel art clothing inspired by the franchise, and a Moschino-themed stuff pack titled Moschino Stuff. A reality competition TV series, The Sims Spark'd, premiered on TBS from July 17, 2020, to August 7, 2020, featuring twelve contestants from popular YouTube channels in the Sims fan community; contestants were tasked with gameplay challenges within The Sims 4, to create characters and stories following the challenge's themes and limitations.

The "Sims Sessions" in-game music festival was a limited-time event hosted from June 29, 2021, to July 7, 2021, and was accessible within a special area in the game world. Singers Bebe Rexha, Glass Animals frontman Dave Bayley, and Joy Oladokun recorded Simlish versions of their songs "Sabotage", "Heat Waves", and "Breathe Again", respectively, for their in-game performances during the event.

 Reception The Sims 4 received "mixed or average reviews" reviews from critics upon its release, according to review aggregator site Metacritic. Reviewers frequently criticized The Sims 4s lack of features and missing content compared to previous titles, particularly The Sims 3s "Create-a-Style" color customization tool, open worlds, and gameplay elements from its expansion packs; reviewers also noted encountering frequent loading screens and some glitches.

Jim Sterling of The Escapist described the gameplay as "boring", and described The Sims 4 as "shrunken and sterile". Kallie Plagge of IGN was disappointed by the lack of "cool objects" in place of missing content, and noted a lack of furnishing options in Build mode compared to The Sims 3. Nick Tan of GameRevolution describes the game as a "case study for loss aversion", noting frustration among Sims fans due to the missing features and content, concluding that the game is "woefully incomplete". Reviewers speculated that the notable lack of content is in lieu of features for potential future paid DLC packs, and is an intentional financial decision by EA. Lee Cooper of Hardcore Gamer concluded that the game is "a glorified freemium app with multiple expansions on the horizon that should have been part of the core-game."

On the positive end, reviewers praised the game's improved graphical quality, intuitive Build mode and Create-a-Sim tools, the Sim emotion and multitasking systems in gameplay, and the Gallery feature. Plagge of IGN commended that she did not need to micro-manage Sims’ interactions with the multitasking system. Cooper of Hardcore Gamer described the new Create-a-Sim as a "veritable hodgepodge of options", despite the omission of Create-a-Style. VanOrd of GameSpot praised the visual and audio design, and expressed the combination of the emotion and multitasking systems as a "sheer delight". Tan of GameRevolution lauded the "unbelievable" animation quality, intuitive game interface, and better performance and stability compared to previous The Sims titles. Chris Thursten of PC Gamer highlighted the ability to download lookalike Sims of real-life celebrities via the Gallery, and noted that the emotion system "changes the feel and flow of the game". Alexander Sliwinski from Joystiq commended the new search function in Build mode.

The PlayStation 4 and Xbox One versions of the game, released in 2017, received additional criticism for its controller-based game controls, as well as various bugs, glitches, and performance issues.

 Sales The Sims 4 has received 36 million players worldwide across all platforms as of 2021, and has generated over $1 billion of total revenue as of 2019. At its release in 2014, The Sims 4 was the first PC game to top the all-format video game charts since Guild Wars 2 (2012). In 2018, EA reported that all expansion packs combined had sold over 30 million units.

 Post-release 
In response to players' complaints about missing features, Maxis pledged to introduce additional content and features to The Sims 4 via free updates. This includes features from past The Sims main titles that were excluded at launch such as swimming pools, genealogy, toddler Sim life stage, and basements. Other major features added in updates include the Newcrest sandbox world, gender customization in Create-a-Sim, gameplay scenarios, terrain manipulation tools, "Neighbourhood Stories" gameplay storytelling system, a "wants and fears" goal system, and an infant Sim life stage. EA affirmed their commitment to long-term support of the game for "ten years, fifteen years, or more" in 2021, citing a "shift across the entire games industry to support and nurture our communities long-term". As of 2022, free content and feature updates for the game continue to be released regularly.

An update released in July 2022 alongside the High School Years expansion pack inadvertently introduced several glitches to the game, enabling incestual relationships between family members, and rapidly aging Sims. The development team acknowledged the glitches on Twitter and resolved them in an August 2022 update.

EA announced in September 2022 that The Sims 4 base game would become free-to-play on all platforms, starting from October 18, 2022. This makes The Sims 4 the fourth free-to-play entry in the series, following The Sims Social, The Sims FreePlay, and The Sims Mobile. For a limited time, existing players who had purchased the game previously were entitled to a free copy of the Desert Luxe Kit, a DLC pack containing a small variety of furniture and Build mode items.

In an October 2022 livestream, Maxis announced a partnership with mod distribution website CurseForge, to provide an official distribution platform for The Sims 4 mods and custom content. Maxis also revealed in the livestream that a sequel to The Sims 4 is in development, under the working title of "Project Rene", and showed footage of potential game functions, such as co-op multiplayer in Build mode and cross-compatibility with desktop and mobile platforms.

 Downloadable content packs 

Paid downloadable content (DLC) packs for The Sims 4 have been released since 2015; there are four categories of DLC packs: expansion packs, "game packs", "stuff packs", and "kits". Expansion packs are the largest content packs, primarily focusing on major new features relevant to a theme. Game packs are similar to expansion packs, but include a smaller amount of content. Stuff packs are minor DLC packs only containing a small number of furniture and clothing items. Kits are the smallest DLC packs, with each kit exclusively focusing on either furniture or clothing items. Critic reviews for expansion packs and game packs have received "generally favorable" to "mixed or average" reception, according to Metacritic.

 Expansion packs 

 Game packs 

 Issues Star Wars: Journey to Batuu, the ninth game pack for The Sims 4, was announced on August 27, 2020. The pack announcement was received negatively by players, who felt it de-prioritized community-requested features and content for the game, with some speculating it was a contractual obligation given EA's ownership of the Star Wars video game franchise. Prior to the pack's announcement, an independent poll by Digital Spy asked players what themes they would like to see in future The Sims 4 content packs; Star Wars came in last out of twenty-one possible choices. Maxis issued a statement in response to the negative player reception, revealing development updates on selected community-requested features and upcoming content, and cited issues during development with "foundational technology" when developing these features.My Wedding Stories, the eleventh game pack for The Sims 4, was announced on February 8, 2022. The day after the pack announcement, Maxis stated that they will not release the pack in Russia, citing video game laws prohibiting content promoting homosexuality as a societal norm. After strong backlash and feedback from Russian players, Maxis reversed their decision and released the pack in Russia, unaltered and unchanged, citing that they "reassessed their options". However, since March 2022, Electronic Arts has suspended all video game sales in Russia, due to the ongoing Russian invasion of Ukraine.

Additionally, after My Wedding Storiess release on February 23, 2022, it received criticism from players and reviewers for its numerous bugs and glitches, which render the game's headline wedding event feature unplayable. This included Sims not walking up and down the aisle correctly, guests showing up in improper wedding attire, and guests performing inappropriate activities during the wedding ceremonies. The pack received an aggregate critic score of 62% on Metacritic, the lowest for a The Sims 4'' game pack to date. Maxis later released an update to address some of these glitches on March 31, 2022.

Notes

References

External links 
 
 

2014 video games
Electronic Arts games
Free-to-play video games
Life simulation games
MacOS games
PlayStation 4 games
Single-player video games
Social simulation video games
The Sims
Transgender-related video games
Video games about personifications of death
Video games about ghosts
Video games featuring protagonists of selectable gender
Video games with downloadable content
Video games with custom soundtrack support
Windows games
Xbox Cloud Gaming games
Xbox One games
Video games scored by Ilan Eshkeri
Video games with expansion packs
Video games developed in the United States